Bunny ears (Opuntia microdasys) is a species of cactus.

Bunny ears may also refer to:

 Double figure-eight loop, a multi-loop knot
 Set-top tv antenna, a common dipole antenna
 V sign, a hand gesture behind another person's head giving the impression of "ears" or "horns"
 the ears of a chocolate bunny, or chocolate molded as the ears only

See also
 Rabbit Ears (disambiguation)